Bcl-2-like protein 11, commonly called BIM (Bcl-2 Interacting Mediator of cell death), is a protein that in humans is encoded by the BCL2L11 gene.

Function 

The protein encoded by this gene belongs to the BCL-2 protein family. BCL-2 family members form hetero- or homodimers and act as anti- or pro-apoptotic regulators that are involved in a wide variety of cellular activities. The protein encoded by this gene contains a Bcl-2 homology domain 3 (BH3). It has been shown to interact with other members of the BCL-2 protein family, including BCL2, BCL2L1/BCL-X(L), and MCL1, and to act as an apoptotic activator. The expression of this gene can be induced by nerve growth factor (NGF), as well as by the forkhead transcription factor FKHR-L1 (FoxO3a), which suggests a role of this gene in neuronal and lymphocyte apoptosis. Transgenic studies of the mouse counterpart suggested that this gene functions as an essential initiator of apoptosis in thymocyte-negative selection. Several alternatively spliced transcript variants of this gene have been identified.

Regulation of Bim 

Bim expression and activity are regulated at the transcriptional, translational and post-translational levels; coordinated expression and activity of Bim shape immune responses, and ensure tissue integrity. Cancer cells develop mechanisms that suppress Bim expression, which allows for tumor progression and metastasis.

Interactions 

BCL2L11 has been shown to interact with:
 BCL2-like 1, 
 BCL2L2, 
 Bcl-2,
 DYNLL1,  and
 MCL1.

See also
 Bcl-2

References

Further reading

External links